The discography of American rock band Cage the Elephant consists of five studio albums, two live albums, one extended play, 17 singles and 18 music videos. The band released their self-titled debut album in June 2008. It peaked at number 59 on the United States Billboard 200 and at number 18 on the Billboard Top Alternative Albums chart. The album has been certified platinum by the Recording Industry Association of America (RIAA). "Ain't No Rest for the Wicked", the album's third single, peaked at number 83 on the Billboard Hot 100 and became a top 50 hit in Canada and the United Kingdom. The singles "In One Ear" and "Back Against the Wall" both topped the Billboard Alternative Songs chart.

Thank You, Happy Birthday, the band's second studio album, was released in January 2011. It peaked at number two on the Billboard 200, as well as on the Top Alternative Albums and Top Rock Albums charts. "Shake Me Down", the album's lead single, peaked at number 78 on the Billboard Hot 100 and became the band's third number-one hit on the Alternative Songs chart. The album's remaining singles—"Around My Head", "Aberdeen" and "Always Something"—all entered the latter chart.

Their third album Melophobia (2013) featured the hit singles "Cigarette Daydreams" and "Come a Little Closer".

In 2015, they released their fourth studio album Tell Me I'm Pretty. "Mess Around", "Trouble" and "Cold Cold Cold" were all released as singles.

On November 26, 2018, they announced their fifth studio album, Social Cues, which was released on April 19, 2019.

Albums

Studio albums

Live albums

Extended plays

Singles

Promotional singles

Other charted songs

Guest appearances

Music videos

Notes

References

External links
 Cage the Elephant at AllMusic
 
 

Discographies of American artists
Rock music group discographies